Syed Ainul Hasan is a professor of Persian & Central Asian Studies School of Language, Literature & Culture Studies at Jawaharlal Nehru University, New Delhi. He has had experience with teaching and research for a period of over thirty-two years, and he has designed courses for University of Kashmir, Jawaharlal Nehru University, and Cotton College State University. He played a key role in enhancing Indo Afghan relation by introducing Afghan Resource Centre in Jawaharlal Nehru University, New Delhi. He was awarded President of India certificate of honor award in 2017 

He was appointed Vice Chancellor of Maulana Azad National Urdu University, Hyderabad  on 23 July 2021

Areas of interest/specialization
Indo-Iran Relations, Literature & Culture Studies, Indology, Globalization

Positions held

 Fulbright Professor, Rutgers University of New Jersey, Department of Middle Eastern Studies, USA
 Chairperson, Persian & Central Asian Studies, JNU
 President, Persian Scholars Association of India, 2009 & 2011
 President (Iranian Section), All India Oriental Conference
 "Wizarat - e- Irshad" of Islamic Republic of Iran as Persian Poet of the Year in 2007 
 Chairman Persian Section for National Council for Promotion of Urdu Language

Notable books

 DASTANBOO (Mirza Ghalib's Persian Diary)
 SOTUNHAY-E- SHEIR-E- NOV (Trends in New Persian Poetry)
 STUDIES ON PERSIAN LANGUAGE AND LITERATURE: ISSUES & THEMES
 PERSIAN GRAMMAR BOOK- (FOR NON-PERSIAN SPEAKING STUDENTS)
 MARA HUA CHAAND- (A NOVEL BY RAJKISHOR) TRANSLATED FROM HINDI INTO URDU
 GAUHAR-E-SHAB CHARAGH-E-ISMAT, (EDITED) PUBLISHED BY ISLAMIC WONDERS BUREAU
 NAQD-O- BARRASI-E- ADABIYYAT-E- KHORDSALAN (ACRITICAL STUDY ON CHILDREN’S LITERATURE-)
 MAULANA AZAD: Memare-Farhange-Hindo-Irani

References

External links
https://www.jnu.ac.in/dean-of-schools

1957 births
Living people